Frank Balkovec (born November 26, 1959) is a retired professional Canadian football linebacker who played for eight seasons for the Edmonton Eskimos, Calgary Stampeders, and Ottawa Rough Riders. He was drafted first overall in the 1984 CFL Draft by the BC Lions. He played college football for the Toronto Varsity Blues.

References

1959 births
Living people
Sportspeople from Novo Mesto
Yugoslav emigrants to Canada
Slovenian emigrants to Canada
Canadian football linebackers
Toronto Varsity Blues football players
Calgary Stampeders players
Edmonton Elks players
Ottawa Rough Riders players